John Chetauya Nwankwo Donald Okeh (born 25 September 2000), known as John Nwankwo or simply John, is a Spanish professional footballer who plays for Elche CF. Mainly a defensive midfielder, he can also play as a central defender.

Career
Born in Murcia, John joined Villarreal CF's youth setup in 2015, from Real Murcia. He made his senior debut with the C-team on 24 August 2019, coming on as a second-half substitute in a 3–0 Tercera División away win against CF Recambios Colón.

In September 2020, John joined Elche CF and was initially assigned to the reserves also in the fourth division. He scored his first senior goal on 22 November, netting the equalizer in a 2–2 draw at Hércules CF B.

John made his first team debut on 16 December 2020, starting and scoring an own goal in a 2–1 away win against CD Buñol, for the season's Copa del Rey. His La Liga occurred three days later, as he started in a 3–1 away loss against Atlético Madrid but was replaced at half-time.

Personal life
Born in Spain, John is of Nigerian descent.

References

External links

2000 births
Living people
Footballers from Murcia
Spanish footballers
Association football midfielders
Villarreal CF C players
Elche CF Ilicitano footballers
Elche CF players
La Liga players
Tercera División players
Tercera Federación players
Spanish sportspeople of African descent
Spanish people of Nigerian descent
Sportspeople of Nigerian descent